The defending champion was Justine Henin-Hardenne, but she chose not to compete.

Svetlana Kuznetsova won the title, defeating Ágnes Szávay in the final. She was leading 6–4, 3–0, until Szávay retired.

Seeds 
The top four seeds received a bye into the second round.

Draw

Finals

Top half

Bottom half

External links 
 WTA tournament draws

Women's Singles